Clometocillin (or clometacillin) is a penicillin.

References 

Penicillins
Phenylethanolamine ethers